Chawalit On-Chim (born 29 September 1945) is a Thai boxer. He competed in the men's flyweight event at the 1972 Summer Olympics.

References

1945 births
Living people
Chawalit On-Chim
Chawalit On-Chim
Boxers at the 1972 Summer Olympics
Place of birth missing (living people)
Flyweight boxers